Qadamgah (also Romanized as Qadamgāh; also known as Bādāmyār and Bādām Yār) is a village in Qebleh Daghi Rural District, Howmeh District, Azarshahr County, East Azerbaijan Province, Iran. At the 2006 census, its population was 589, in 141 families.

References 

Populated places in Azarshahr County